Together is an duet album by  Jerry Lee Lewis and his sister Linda Gail Lewis. The album was released in 1969 on the Smash record label.

Background
In the wake of his comeback success with the album Another Place, Another Time in 1968, Lewis renegotiated his record contract with Smash and secured a deal for his sister Linda Gail, who had been part of his road show for years.

Five years earlier, Sam Phillips had actually signed Linda Gail to Sun Records (largely to placate her brother) and cut several sides with her, even using their duet of the George Jones song "Seasons of My Heart" as the B-side of the Lewis single "Teenage Letter", but scrapped any further releases after Lewis left the label.

She eventually managed to release a couple of singles with ABC Paramount and Columbia but, as Colin Escott put it in the liner notes for the 1986 retrospective The Killer: The Smash/Mercury Years, Linda Gail's ambitions "unfortunately outstripped her talent."

Contents
Jerry Lee and Linda Gail's rendition of "Don't Let Me Cross Over" was issued as single and rose to number 12 on the Billboard country singles chart. The album also includes several songs that had been hit duets for other artists, such as "Jackson" and "Milwaukee (Here I Come)". "Don't Take It Out on Me" was written by Linda Gail and Jerry Lee's guitarist Kenny Lovelace, and the same pair teamed up with Jerry Lee's manager Cecil Harrelson to compose "Secret Places". Linda would eventually marry and divorce both Lovelace and Harrelson.

The Lewis siblings also appeared together in a 1969 television special called The Many Sounds of Jerry Lee Lewis.

Track listing
"Milwaukee (Here I Come)" (Lee Fikes) - 1:55
"Jackson" (Billy Edd Wheeler, Jerry Leiber [as Gaby Rodgers]) - 2:21
"Don't Take It Out on Me" (Linda Gail Lewis, Kenny Lovelace) - 2:04
"Cryin' Time" (Buck Owens) - 2:38
"Sweet Thang" (Nat Stuckey) - 2:13
"Secret Places" (Cecil J. Harrelson, Linda Gail Lewis, Kenny Lovelace) - 2:46
"Don't Let Me Cross Over" (Penny Jay) - 2:56
"Gotta Travel On" (Paul Clayton, Larry Ehrlich, Lee Hays, Fred Hellerman, David Lazar, Pete Seeger) - 1:54
"We Live in Two Different Worlds" (Fred Rose) - 2:11
"Earth Up Above (Grand Ole Moon Up Above)" (Donald Murray) - 1:58
"Roll Over Beethoven" (Chuck Berry) - 1:56

1969 albums
Jerry Lee Lewis albums
Albums produced by Jerry Kennedy